Ibrahima Diallo may refer to:

 Ibrahima Diallo (politician) (1915–1958), Senegalese politician
 Ibrahima Diallo (judoka) (born 1959), Senegalese judoka
 Ibrahima Diallo (footballer, born 1985), retired Guinean footballer
 Ibrahima Diallo (Paralympic footballer) (born 1993), English Paralympic footballer for Bitton A.F.C.
 Ibrahima Diallo (footballer, born 1999), French footballer for Southampton F.C.
 Ibrahima Kandia Diallo (born 1941), Guinean footballer

See also
 Ibrahim Diallo (disambiguation)